Brian Carr (born 20 June 1969, in Glasgow) is a Scottish amateur featherweight and professional super bantam/feather/super featherweight boxer of the 1990s and 2000s.

Boxing career

Amateur career
As an amateur he won the 1990 Amateur Boxing Association of England (ABAE) featherweight title, when boxing out of the Auchengeich BC, against John Williams (Pontypool & Panteg BC).

He represented Great Britain at featherweight in the Boxing at the 1992 Summer Olympics in Barcelona, Spain, losing to eventual silver medal winner Faustino Reyes of Spain.

Professional career
As a professional he won the British Boxing Board of Control (BBBofC) Scottish Area featherweight title, and Commonwealth super bantamweight title (won against Meshack Kondwani), and was a challenger for the British super bantamweight title against; Michael Brodie, Patrick Mullings, Michael Alldis, and Esham Pickering, and World Boxing Union (WBU) featherweight title against Cassius Baloyi.

References

External links

1969 births
Boxers at the 1992 Summer Olympics
Featherweight boxers
Living people
Olympic boxers of Great Britain
Scottish male boxers
Boxers from Glasgow
Super-bantamweight boxers
Super-featherweight boxers